The 77th Separate Airmobile Brigade is a brigade of the Ukrainian Air Assault Forces formed in the summer of 2022, based in Zhytomyr.

History
The brigade was formed in the summer of 2022 as part of the expansion of the Ukrainian Air Assault Forces. Its first units finished basic training in October 2022.

The units received decorations and praise from Ukrainian president Volodymyr Zelenskyy along with the 46th Airmobile Brigade for its defense of Soledar. Following the capture of Soledar by Russian forced on January 16, 2023 the unit has joined in the defense of Bakhmut.

Structure 
As of 2022 the brigade's structure is as follows:

 77th Air Assault Brigade, Zhytomyr
 Headquarters & Headquarters Company
 1st Battalion
 2nd Battalion
 3rd Battalion
 Self-propelled howitzer and artillery division
 Howitzer artillery division
 Anti-aircraft missile and artillery division
 Reconnaissance company
 Tank company
 Support units (including: engineers, snipers, communication, medics, radiation and chemical detection units and material support)

References 

Brigades of the Ukrainian Air Assault Forces
Military units and formations established in 2022
Airborne infantry brigades
2022 establishments in Ukraine
Military units and formations of the 2022 Russian invasion of Ukraine